Joey Eijpe (born January 17, 1988 in Huizen) is a Dutch former professional baseball player. He played for HCAW in the Honkbal Hoofdklasse from 2006 to 2011.

External links

1988 births
Living people
Dutch baseball players
People from Huizen
HCAW players
Sportspeople from North Holland
21st-century Dutch people